The shiny green miner bee (Perdita albipennis) is a species of miner bee in the family Andrenidae. Another common name for this species is the white-winged perdita. It is found in Central America and North America.

Subspecies
These three subspecies belong to the species Perdita albipennis:
 Perdita albipennis albipennis
 Perdita albipennis canadensis Crawford, 1912
 Perdita albipennis mut Cockerell

References

Further reading

 
 

Andrenidae
Articles created by Qbugbot
Insects described in 1868
Hymenoptera of North America